Nettie Nielsen (born 23 July 1964) is a retired female badminton player from Denmark.

European & Danish titles
Nielsen won the gold medal at the 1988 and 1990 European Badminton Championships in women's doubles with Dorte Kjaer. She took a silver medal in the girls singles event at the European Junior Badminton Championships in 1981. Together with compatriot Dorte Kjaer she won the European juniors girls doubles title in 1981. In 1983 they became the Danish National ladies doubles champions for the first time. Together they won the Danish National Badminton Championships a total of six times (1983, 1985, 1986, 1987, 1988 & 1990).

Other International titles
Nettie Nielsen won the ladies singles title of the German Open in 1983.

Nettie Nielsen and Dorte Kjaer won a bronze medal in Women's doubles at the 1988 Summer Olympics in Seoul when badminton was an exhibition sport. Nettie Nielsen was the Nordic ladies singles champion in 1982. She also won the Nordic badminton Championships in Women's doubles in 1982, 1984, 1985, 1986, 1987 and 1988 with Dorte Kjaer. Together they won the Scottish Open twice in 1985 & 1986. Nettie Nielsen won her first big Open title in mixed doubles with Morten Frost in 1983 at the Scottish Open. With Jesper Knudsen she won the Nordic badminton mixed doubles titles in 1987 & 1988 and Grand Prix titles at the Dutch Open in 1988 and Danish Opens in 1988 and 1989. They were also runners-up in the mixed doubles at the All England Open 1988.

Achievements

IBF World Grand Prix 
The World Badminton Grand Prix sanctioned by International Badminton Federation (IBF) since 1983.

Women's doubles

Mixed doubles

IBF International 
Women's singles

Mixed doubles

References

Danish female badminton players
Living people
Badminton players at the 1988 Summer Olympics
1964 births
People from Roskilde
Sportspeople from Region Zealand